Left Recomposition is a Greek political organisation.

History
Left Recomposition was founded in 2003 as the merger of Aristeres Syspeiroseis and Aristeri Kinisi (Left Movement).

See also
Politics of Greece
List of political parties in Greece

References

External links
Left Recomposition website

Political parties in Greece
2000s in Greek politics